Ewell Herman Elliott, Jr. (born March 22, 1936) is an American former politician and judge. He served in the Georgia House of Representatives from 1973 to 1983  as a Republican.

References

Living people
1936 births
Democratic Party members of the Georgia House of Representatives